Vampires vs. the Bronx is a 2020 American comedy horror film directed by Oz Rodriguez and written by Oz Rodriguez and Blaise Hemingway. Vampires vs. the Bronx follows a group of teenagers who are forced to protect their neighborhood in the Bronx when a gathering of vampires invades. It stars Jaden Michael, Gerald W. Jones III, Gregory Diaz IV, Sarah Gadon, Method Man, Shea Whigham, and Coco Jones.

It was released on October 2, 2020, by Netflix.

Plot
While getting her nails done in the Bronx, (New York City’s northernmost borough) new resident Vivian learns from salon owner Becky that Becky will be selling her salon to real estate group Murnau Properties, who have been buying up land all over the neighborhood. After Vivian leaves, Murnau broker Frank Polidori comes in to finalize the sale, and watches as a vampire kills Becky.

Miguel Martinez is organizing a block party to raise money to save the Primo bodega, a local corner store owned by Tony that is under threat of closing. He is joined by best friends Bobby and Luis; the three grew up in the bodega. Miguel expresses concern that the neighborhood is being gentrified. As he is later hanging up posters in front of a courthouse purchased by Murnau, he sees men watching him, and is chased by Slim, a member of Henny's gang; Slim is killed by one of the men. Miguel flees to Tony's and hides with Bobby and Luis. The vampire enters looking for him, and the three notice that he does not appear in any of the mirrors.

The next day, they watch Blade and go over everything they know about killing vampires. They visit a Murnau Properties office to attempt to find where the vampires rest during the daylight; Frank threatens them, stating that being from the Bronx, they could vanish and no one would notice. The boys grab a file from his desk and escape. They find a USB drive containing plans for vampire nests throughout the Bronx, as well as a skeleton key. They discover that the courthouse is the nest and break in. Miguel films himself opening a coffin, revealing a vampire, who chases them out. They are picked up by police for trespassing, and confronted by the Bronx residents. Miguel attempts to show everyone the video as proof, but is laughed at when it only shows him opening an empty coffin. He challenges Frank to step into the sunlight, but is dismayed when Frank does so and requests the stolen file back. Frank, who is revealed to be a human servant to the vampires, finds that Miguel has kept the key, and hires Henny and his gang to hunt down the trio.

Vivian visits the bodega to look for Miguel; Tony realizes that she too is a vampire and is killed by her. The boys see Tony's bodega boarded up by Murnau and realize he has been killed. Miguel takes Tony's prized Sammy Sosa bat and vows to kill the vampires. Henny and his gang attempt to rob the vampires, but are killed. The kids are pursued by vampires and escorted to Miguel's home by Vivian. They realize Vivian is a vampire and beg Miguel's mother not to invite her in, as vampires cannot enter without an invitation. Vivian reveals that she is the leader of the Murnau vampire coven, and demands the key back. Miguel splashes her with holy water and she flees. The next morning, the trio gathers supplies to defeat the coven. In the courthouse, they manage to kill several vampires. Vivian takes the key and reveals that it opens a box containing the remains of the first vampire, whose ashes can be used to grow their army. Bobby convinces Frank that the vampires will never see him as one of their own, and he lets them go before he is killed by Vivian. Vivian incapacitates them and is about to kill Miguel when the Bronx residents arrive with homemade weapons. The ensuing fight ends with Miguel stabbing Vivian with Tony's bat and killing her.

Two weeks later, Miguel passes by a mural in memorial of Tony on his way to the block party. He and his friends decide that they make good vampire-hunters. Resident Gloria films a livestream, warning future invaders that her community will always support each other.

Cast

Production
On August 14, 2018, it was announced that Broadway Video and Caviar had begun production on Vampires vs. the Bronx, a film written and directed by Osmany Rodriguez from Universal Pictures. Executive producers were expected to include Lorne Michaels, Erin David, Bert Hamelinck and Michael Sagol. Sarah Gadon, Chris Redd, The Kid Mero, Method Man, Shea Whigham, Vladimir Caamaño, Jaden Michael, Gregory Diaz IV, Gerald W. Jones III and Coco Jones were also announced to star in the film.

Principal photography for the film had reportedly already begun by August 2018.

Release
In September 2020, Netflix acquired the distribution rights to the film from Universal Pictures. It was released on October 2, 2020.

Reception
The website's critics consensus reads, "In the sharp, socially conscious battle of Vampires vs. the Bronx, comedy and horror blend brilliantly – and the audience is the winner." On Metacritic, the film has a score of 76 out of 100 based on reviews from five critics, indicating "generally favorable reviews".

Nick Allen of RogerEbert.com gave it 3 out of 4 and wrote: "When a horror-comedy is as agile, charming, and funny as this, everybody wins."
Felix Vasquez Jr. gave it a positive review, calling it "A fun, creepy, and exciting Halloween treat that completely side steps the hum drum Vampire narrative in favor [sic] something original and unique."
Roger Moore of Movie Nation wrote: "Nobody should be making serious vampire or zombie movies at this stage of the horror cycle, so this riff on the genre absolutely fills the bill. And making it a commentary on gentrification? Inspired."

References

External links
 

2020 comedy horror films
American comedy horror films
American vampire films
Films set in the Bronx
Films about social issues in the United States
Films shot in New York City
English-language Netflix original films
Works about gentrification
2020s monster movies
2020s English-language films
2020s American films